The 1987–88 season was FC Dinamo București's 39th season in Divizia A. Dinamo had a perfect start in the championship, winning the first ten games. In the 11th round came the first and only defeat of the season, against Politehnica Timişoara. Despite that, Dinamo finished second, behind Steaua. In the Romanian Cup, Dinamo reached the final, where it met Steaua. The final had an unusual development. Steaua scored first, Dinamo equalised in the 87 minute, and in the additional time Steaua scored a goal, invalidated by the referee, due to offside. Steaua players left the field, Dinamo was given the trophy, but later the Romanian F.A. (bowing to pressure from the Communist Party) awarded the match 2–1 to Steaua. After the revolution of December 1989, Steaua propositioned to return the trophy to Dinamo, which refused to take it.

In Europe, Dinamo was eliminated in the first round of the Cup Winners Cup, by the future winner of the competition, KV Mechelen.

Results

Romanian Cup final

Cup Winners' Cup 
First round

KV Mechelen won 3-0 on aggregate

Squad 
Goalkeepers: Dumitru Moraru, Florin Prunea, Bogdan Stelea.

Defenders: Iulian Mihăescu, Ioan Andone, Mircea Rednic, Ioan Varga, Lică Movilă, Alexandru Nicolae, Bogdan Bucur, Vasile Jercălău.

Midfielders: Ionuț Lupescu, Dănuț Lupu, Dorin Mateuț, Costel Orac, Ilie Balaci, Gheorghe Dumitrașcu, Marcel Sabou, George Timiș, Mihai Stoica, Mario Marinică.

Forwards: Rodion Cămătaru, Claudiu Vaișcovici, Marian Damaschin, Florin Răducioiu.

Transfers 
Dinamo brought Claudiu Vaișcovici in the winter break. The striker bought from Victoria București scored 22 goals for Dinamo in the second part of the championship.

References 
 www.labtof.ro
 www.romaniansoccer.ro

1987
Dinamo Bucuresti